Drayton may refer to:

People
 Drayton (surname)

Legal cases
 United States v. Drayton, 536 U.S. 194 (2002)

Places

Australia

Drayton, Queensland, a locality in the Toowoomba Region
Shire of Drayton, a former local government area in Queensland

Canada

 Drayton, Ontario

United Kingdom
 Drayton, Hampshire, a close suburb of Portsmouth
 Drayton, Leicestershire
 Drayton, Norfolk, a satellite village of Norwich
 Drayton, Northamptonshire, a suburb of Daventry
 Drayton, Cherwell, Oxfordshire, a satellite village of Banbury
 Drayton, Vale of White Horse, Oxfordshire, a satellite village of Abingdon

 Drayton St. Leonard, Oxfordshire, locally abbreviated sometimes to Drayton
 Drayton, Somerset

 Drayton Beauchamp, Buckinghamshire
Drayton, a former hamlet, later known as Drayton Green, now part of West Ealing, Greater London
 Drayton Green railway station
 Drayton Manor High School
 Drayton, the south-east of the parish of Swineshead, Lincolnshire
 Drayton, a reduced, much renamed and subdivided estate of Barton Stacey, north-west Hampshire
 Drayton, a reduced, partly renamed and subdivided estate of South Petherton, Somerset
 Drayton, Worcestershire, a largely subdivided estate of Chaddesley Corbett, Worcestershire

United States
 Drayton, Georgia
 Drayton, North Dakota
 Drayton, South Carolina, an unincorporated community
 Drayton Hall, South Carolina

Other place names

United Kingdom
 Drayton Bassett, Staffordshire
 Drayton Beauchamp, Buckinghamshire
 Drayton House, Northamptonshire
 Drayton Manor, Staffordshire
 Drayton Manor Theme Park, Staffordshire
 Drayton Park railway station, Greater London
 Drayton Parslow, Buckinghamshire
East Drayton, Nottinghamshire
 Fenny Drayton, Leicestershire
 Market Drayton, Shropshire
 West Drayton, Greater London
West Drayton, Nottinghamshire

See also
 Draycott (disambiguation)